Matadero Madrid is the site of a former slaughterhouse, the El Matadero y Mercado Municipal de Ganados (English: Municipal Slaughterhouse and Cattle Market) in the Arganzuela district of Madrid. Today, it is a contemporary arts centre.

History

Slaughterhouse 
Architect  was commissioned by the City Council of Madrid to design the complex. The slaughterhouse (in Spanish: matadero) and cattle market were built from 1911 and 1925. The project by was structured around a complex of pavilions characterized by functionality, constructive rationality, and conceptual simplicity. There is however a historicist element to the architecture, which incorporates Neo-Mudéjar features, such as tiles with abstract designs. The facilities began to be used in 1924 and 1925 and continued operation until the slaughterhouse closed in 1996.

Arts centre 
At the turn of the 21st century, Madrid City Council decided to turn this space into an arts centre. The Matadero Madrid opened in 2006.

Management
Matadero Madrid is a project promoted by Madrid City Council's Department of the Arts and managed by the Directorate General for Cultural Projects through Matadero Madrid's coordination team, in collaboration with other public and private organizations.

Facilities

Abierto X Obras
The refurbished refrigeration room in the former slaughterhouse is a unique space for "site-specific" artistic work. The installation programme includes well-known artists with a commitment to young ideas.

Archivo Matadero
Archivo Matadero is a space for consultation and research for accessing physical and online documentation in the four archives that compose it: Archivo de Creadores de Madrid, artea, FreshMadrid and Madrid Abierto. This is a point of access to a wide array of documents on the different disciplines in which each of the archives works: the visual arts, the performing arts, architecture and urban planning and public art.

El Taller
Devoted to thought and discussion, this facility is designed especially for meetings between artists and the public. All kinds of workshops (Taller is the Spanish word for workshop), discussions and lectures are held here.

Extensión Avam
Through its satellite office, the Associated Visual Artists of Madrid (AVAM) will offer specialised services to professionals in the contemporary art sector, operating in a network with the AVAM Workshops in Pradolongo.

Calle y Plaza Matadero
Both individually and together, these spaces are used to accommodate large art events: dance, theatrical and circus performances, concerts and big art interventions in the open air. They are also the complex's main area for meeting and socialising.

Cineteca
The Cineteca aims to become the Mecca of the documentary film genre in Madrid. In addition to the RafaelAzcona Theatre, which will be open to exploring all kinds of visual content for all types of audiences, other spaces will be coordinated to take in a wide array of screenings in different formats and styles while always committed to formal and narrative risks. Aside from screenings, its other lines of work also deal with artistic creation thanks to the film set, training and memory conservation open to all through the Archivo Documenta. It is the permanent headquarters of the Documenta Madrid film festival

Depósito de Especies
The water tank of the old Legazpi slaughterhouse has been turned into a plant memorial and archive, a "Noah’s Ark" of the species found in the vicinity of Matadero Madrid today. A public garden that can be visited through the new access point at the  roundabout.

Avant Garden
Designed by the French-German group atelier le balto, the Avant Garden offers ecological and participatory activities.

Intermediæ
Intermediæ is a public, experimental programme. Conceived as a laboratory, not a museum, Intermediæ operates with creation as a means of exploration, research, and experimentation. Process and participation are the formulas for its development. The programme works with the community; ecology, art and activism; games as a form of exploration; visual culture; archival processes and memory; and the Creative Arts Grants programme, as a way to collectively define the institution. La nave, the Terrario and Avant Garden, different exhibit and activity formats, invite visitors to inhabit a space in transformation.

Naves del Español
Artistic creation focused on the performing arts has been an important resource in Matadero Madrid; the Naves del Español is one of the cornerstones of the project. This great staging centre is managed by Teatro Español. It is composed of three buildings joined with a main hall, which can be configured as needed and is unique in Madrid due to its formal characteristics and technical features; a theatre-café, which also functions as a foyer or lobby to the performance space; and Room 2, for small-format shows, next to spaces for rehearsal and training.

Central de Diseño
A space given over entirely to design, at the service of Madrid and its inhabitants, where all kinds of different projects are created in connection to graphic, industrial and interior design. Madrid's benchmark space for promoting design was planned as equidistant between economics and culture: graphic design, product design and space design, all understood from the perspective of crosscutting culture able to introduce creative values into economic activity. The centre is promoted by the Association of Designers from Madrid (DIMAD) and is run by its own
foundation (Fundación DIMAD).

Nave 16
With an expository space covering more than four thousand square metres, Nave 16 is the heart of visual arts at Matadero.
Due to its singularity and size, Nave 16 is a unique space in the city of Madrid that can also host all kinds of events thanks to the versatility of its architecture: presentations, major exhibitions, concerts, work production workshops, performances and social activities. It also allows the institutions that make up Matadero Madrid, as well as other national and international ones, to carry out more ambitious projects.

Nave de Música
The Nave de Música was a space occupied by the Red Bull Music Academy until November 2011 and now hosts the centre's entire musical programme. With a radio studio and a recording studio, a small stage for concerts, nine rehearsal rooms and other facilities, the Nave de Música is a true musical village. Another one of the highlights of the place will be the public call that will be made soon and through which emerging musicians and artists will be able to rent several of the studios for rehearsal and experimentation. Also, through a call, one of these studios will be dedicated for use by artists whose career is not limited to music but who develop projects linked with sound, thereby attaining one of Matadero Madrid's main objectives: dialogue and hybridisation between different artistic disciplines. In addition, the old RBMA Radio studio will host Radio Matadero over the next few months, an online radio project open to the public and artists related with Matadero Madrid, which will be used as a channel of expression for what happens at the cultural centre as well as its immediate surroundings.
Covering over 4,000 m2, this space is probably the best known example in Madrid of the new architecture that works with recycled and pre-existing elements, using limited resources but bringing exquisite attention to detail. It was designed by the young architects Langarita and Navarro in collaboration with Mexican designer Jerónimo Hagerman.

La Casa del Lector
This large cultural space is an initiative of the Germán Sánchez Ruipérez Foundation, which mainly focuses on readers and books. This is a place for experiencing reading, its new forms, its promotion and training, along with its intermediaries. It is a place for both the general public and professionals. Exhibitions, conferences, workshops, music and film series, together with applied research, will help to shape readers who understand, evaluate, assimilate, share and interpret the world, society and their times because they read.

References

External links

 Matadero Madrid Website

Arts centres in Spain
Art museums and galleries in Madrid
Entertainment venues in Madrid
Museums in Madrid
Tourist attractions in Madrid
Buildings and structures in Arganzuela District, Madrid